Inside Gatwick is a British documentary reality show. It follows the staff, major renovation and regeneration projects and the day-to-day goings on at Gatwick Airport. It was broadcast on Sky1 from 30 August to 18 October 2011 and the programme is voiced by Ralph Ineson.

Episodes

External links

2011 British television series debuts
2011 British television series endings
British documentary television series
Documentary television series about aviation
English-language television shows
Gatwick Airport
Sky UK original programming